Elections to Trafford Council were held on 4 May 1995.  One-third of the council was up for election, with each successful candidate to serve a four-year term of office, expiring in 1999. The Conservative party lost overall control of the council, to no overall control.

After the election, the composition of the council was as follows:

Ward results

References

1995 English local elections
1995
1990s in Greater Manchester